Jay Barnett (born 14 February 2001), is an Australian professional footballer who plays as a midfielder for Adelaide United.

Career

Brisbane Roar
Barnett signed his first professional contract with Brisbane Roar on 18 October 2017, penning a two-year Scholarship deal with the club. He was part of the 2018-19 Y-League championship winning Brisbane Roar Youth team, playing the full 90 minutes as the Young Roar beat Western Sydney Wanderers Youth 3–1 in the 2019 Y-League Grand Final on 1 February 2019.

Barnett made his first professional appearance as a second-half substitute in the Roar's 2–2 with Western Sydney Wanderers in Round 16 of the 2018–19 season.

Melbourne Victory
On 4 June 2019, Barnett joined Melbourne Victory on a one-year contract. Barnett made 47 appearances for Melbourne Victory in all competitions. After three-and-a-half seasons at Melbourne Victory, the club announced they had agreed to mutually terminate his contract.

Adelaide United
On 8 February 2023, Adelaide United announced they signed Barnett on a two-and-a-half year contract.

Honours
Brisbane Roar
National Youth League: 2018–19

Melbourne Victory
FFA Cup: 2021

Personal life
He is the son of former West Adelaide NSL player Michael Barnett.

References

External links

2001 births
Living people
Australian soccer players
Association football midfielders
Brisbane Roar FC players
Melbourne Victory FC players
A-League Men players
National Premier Leagues players